Coleman Hawkins with the Red Garland Trio (also referred to as Swingville 2001) is an album by saxophonist Coleman Hawkins with pianist Red Garland's trio recorded August 12, 1959 and released on the Swingville label.

Reception

The Allmusic review by Scott Yanow stated: "One of Hawkins's better Prestige sessions (originally on its Swingville subsidiary) finds him fronting a then-modern rhythm section for a variety of basic originals."

Track listing 
 "It's a Blue World" (George Forrest, Robert Wright) – 7:59    
 "I Want to Be Loved" (Savannah Churchill) – 5:54    
 "Red Beans" (Coleman Hawkins, Red Garland) – 4:14    
 "Bean's Blues" (Red Garland) – 11:54    
 "Blues for Ron" (Doug Watkins) – 6:14

Personnel 
 Coleman Hawkins – tenor saxophone   
 Red Garland – piano
 Doug Watkins – bass
 Charles "Specs" Wright – drums

References 

Coleman Hawkins albums
Red Garland albums
1959 albums
Albums recorded at Van Gelder Studio
Swingville Records albums